Jinju Station is a railway station in Jinju, South Korea, and is a stop along the Gyeongjeon Line. KTX service from Seoul to Jinju started with KTX-I / KTX-II trains on December 5, 2012.

The station consists of a small two-story building with a small retail area on the ground floor. Near the station is an old brick train shed. A small train yard is next to the station.

The station serves regular passenger rail & KTX services by Korail.

Railway stations in South Gyeongsang Province
Korea Train Express stations